Ross Island is an alluvial island in the Allegheny River in Manor Township, Armstrong County in the U.S. state of Pennsylvania. The island is situated across from Cadogan and North Buffalo townships.

The elevation of Ross Island is 768 feet above sea level.

References

External links
U.S. Army Corps of Engineers navigation charts

River islands of Pennsylvania
Islands of the Allegheny River in Pennsylvania
Landforms of Armstrong County, Pennsylvania